Pilar Defilló Amiguet (November 11, 1853, Mayagüez, Puerto Rico - March 11, 1931, Catalonia, Spain) was a Puerto Rican and Catalan musician, known as the mother of Enric and Pablo Casals.

Biography
She was the daughter of Joseph Defilló Tusquellas (c.1815 - Mayagüez, 1871) and Raimunda Amiguet Ferrer, who both immigrated to Mayagüez, Puerto Rico in 1849 as political refugees from Cataluña. In Mayagüez, she worked in her father’s shop “El cronometro” keeping the books until his death in 1871. After her father's death, she emigrated with her mother to El Vendrell, Tarragona, in 1871, where she married Carles Casals Ribes, the pianist and organist from the parroquial church El Vendrell, after having been an outstanding pupil of his. Her father had belonged to the Secret Abolitionist Society run by Ramón Emeterio Betances, a friend of the family's.

On May 8, 2015, the birthplace of Pilar Defilló at 21 Calle Mendez Vigo in Mayaguez, Puerto Rico, which had been built in 1841 and recently had been restored, opened as the Casa Museo Pilar Defilló, a cultural museum devoted to Pablo Casals.

References

External links 
 Video inauguración del Museu Pilar Defilló, espacio cultural Pau Casals en Mayagüez, Puerto Rico 

1853 births
1931 deaths
Puerto Rican people of Catalan descent
People from Mayagüez, Puerto Rico